Miller Airport may refer to:

 Miller Airport (Indiana) in Bluffton, Indiana, United States (FAA: C40)
 Miller Airport, Reed City, Michigan (defunct)
 Miller Airport (Ohio) in Alliance, Ohio, United States (FAA: 4G3)
 Miller Airport (Pennsylvania) in Burgettstown, Pennsylvania, United States (closed)
 Miller Airport (Vermont) in Windsor, Vermont, United States (closed)
 Miller Field (airport), an airport in Valentine, Nebraska, United States (FAA: VTN)
 Miller Memorial Airpark in Vale, Oregon, United States (FAA: S49)
 Miller Municipal Airport in Miller, South Dakota, United States (FAA: MKA)

Notes